BVB or bvb may refer to:

Business
 Bursa de Valori Bucuresti (Bucharest Stock Exchange), the largest stock exchange in Romania
 BVB (Cambodia), Bopha Vibol, a Cambodian group of companies

Transport
 Boa Vista-Atlas Brasil Cantanhede International Airport, Brazil (IATA code)
 Basler Verkehrs-Betriebe, the main public transport operator in the Swiss city of Basel
 Berliner Verkehrsbetriebe, the main public transport company in the German capital of Berlin
 Kombinat Berliner Verkehrsbetriebe, the former public transport operator of East Berlin, Germany
 The Bex–Villars–Bretaye railway, in Switzerland

Other uses
 Bibliotheksverbund Bayern, the Bavarian Library Network and Union Catalog in Germany
 Black Veil Brides, an American rock band
 Borussia Dortmund, a German football club (contraction of Ballspielverein Borussia, the first two words of the club's full name)
 Buena Vida Broadcasting, Christian TV network in Texas
 Bharatiya Vidya Bhavan, an Indian cultural organization.
 Bube language of West Africa (ISO code:.bvb)